The 2009–10 S.S. Lazio season was the club's 110th season in their history and their 22nd consecutive season in the top-flight of Italian football. After having won their fifth Coppa Italia the previous season, manager Delio Rossi opted to leave and was replaced by Davide Ballardini, the former manager of Palermo. In his first competitive match, Ballardini led the club to victory in the 2009 Supercoppa Italiana against Internazionale at the Beijing National Stadium.

Pre-season and friendlies

As the previous year, Lazio played their 2009 pre-season matches at the Auronzo di Cadore in Veneto, where they stayed from 10 July to 30 July 2009. Prior to leaving, the kits for the 2009–10 season were presented: produced by Puma, they were shown for the first time at the "Lazio Style" store in Fiumicino on 8 July. At the ceremony, new manager Davide Ballardini and players Tommaso Rocchi, Modibo Diakité and Fernando Muslera were present.

Two days later, the 32-man squad arrived at Auronzo, where they started training under Ballardini, the new manager who replaced Delio Rossi in June, who left Lazio after four years. The first friendly match was played against the local side of Auronzo di Cadore on 12 July: Lazio won 10–0 easily. The next week, Romanian club Universitatea Craiova arrived in Auronzo to play Lazio in another friendly. This time, Lazio drew the match: after Lionel Scaloni scored at the 60th minute, a Michael Baird header locked the match at 1–1.

On 22 July, Lazio played against Lega Pro team SPAL 1907: the match was determined in the second half, with Mauro Zárate and Goran Pandev scoring and making the final Martinucci's goal vane. The final match at Auronzo was played against Serie B team Triestina; in this match, Lazio had a difficult start, with Testini and Luigi Della Rocca scoring two goals for Triestina in the first half. However, the Biancocelesti saved the match thanks to Zárate and Eliseu, who in the second half evened up the score.

After leaving Auronzo, Lazio travelled to China on 2 August in the offing of the Supercoppa Italiana match against Internazionale on 8 August. They stayed in Beijing for seven days and, after winning the game, came back to Rome on 9 August via the Fiumicino Airport, where they were greeted by over 2,000 fans, all celebrating the conquest of the trophy. Lazio played their last friendly match of the pre-season against CA Osasuna at the Stadio Olimpico. Before the game started, the players celebrated in front of the Curva Nord the victory of the last two trophies (Coppa Italia and Supercoppa), with Tommaso Rocchi and Fernando Muslera showing them to the fans. After that, the game started and Osasuna went ahead with a Juanfran goal after 22 minutes, who beat Albano Bizzarri right in front of the goal. Approximately 15 minutes later, Zárate equalized after a Cristian Brocchi cross. No goals were scored after this and the match was determined in the penalty shootout; Lazio won 5–4, with Baronio scoring the last penalty.

Colours: Green = Lazio win; White = draw; Red = away team win.

Supercoppa Italiana

As the 2008–09 Coppa Italia winners, Lazio kicked off the 2009–10 season with the traditional annual curtain-raiser, the 2009 Supercoppa Italiana. The match was played against 2008–09 Serie A winners Internazionale on 8 August at the Beijing National Stadium, exactly one year after the 2008 Summer Olympics opening ceremony.

Lazio opened the scoring by a Matuzalém goal in the 62nd minute, who converted on his own rebound after his shot had been saved by Inter goalkeeper Júlio César. Just five minutes later, Lazio captain Tommaso Rocchi, assisted by Stefano Mauri, scored the second goal by lob in front of Júlio César. Samuel Eto'o scored for Inter by a powerful shot inside the area in the 77th minute, but Lazio defended well and Inter was not able to equalize. The win ensured Tommaso Rocchi could thus lift the Supercoppa Italiana trophy that Lazio won for the third time in their history, and the first one during Claudio Lotito's chairmanship.

Colours: Green = Lazio win; White = draw; Red = away team win.

Serie A
The 2009–10 Serie A fixtures were released on 29 July 2009, with Lazio due to open their campaign against Atalanta. This match, as well as the next one, was played at 20:45 due to Lega Calcio's decision to play the first two-round on night because of the summer heat.

As the previous year, Lazio opened with a victory. Tommaso Rocchi, assisted at the 22nd minute by Pasquale Foggia, who with a long pass put him alone in front of Consigli, waited until the very last moment and placed the ball with cold shoulder. As the match went on, Lazio and Atalanta shared the ball possession and the goal occasions, and Lazio could thus conquest the first three points of the league.

After the Europa League match against Elfsborg played on 27 August at Borås, the Biancocelesti didn't come back to Rome but flew directly to Verona on 28 August to prepare the Serie A second turn against Chievo two days later. As the last match at the Stadio Bentegodi between the two teams, Sergio Pellissier opened the scoring in the first time by a header, after a Michele Marcolini's corner had been deviate by Nicolas Frey. But at the end of the first half, Santiago Morero artlessly held back Julio Cruz in the penalty area: the referee decided for the penalty, that the same Cruz scored marking in this way his first goal at Lazio. At the 51st minute, Mauro Zárate tried a shot from outside the area that Sorrentino beat back inexpertly, allowing to Cruz to score his second goal at free net. Despite Emílson Cribari being sent off six minutes later due to his second yellow card, Lazio managed to win the match and to stay at the top flight with Sampdoria, Juventus and Genoa.

After this game, there was a week off for international duty: in this period, Lazio's players who were not occupied with national teams met Real Zaragoza in a friendly match at La Romareda on 4 September. Two goals in the second half, one by Pasquale Foggia on penalty and the other one by Zárate in the injury time, assured the victory to the Roman team.

Lazio returned to action on 12 September against Juventus at the Stadio Olimpico. The Biancocelesti couldn't line up their regular forwards, Zárate and Rocchi, both of them absent because of injuries. Also, the defender Cribari lost the match due to his red card during the previous game against Chievo.
Before the starting whistle, the starting teams observed a moment of silence in memory of Alessandro Capponi and Nicola Lo Buono, two Lazio players who had died in the same week.
Lazio played very well in the first half and also scored with Mauri in the injury time, but the referee Gervasoni disallowed the goal due to a doubtful Cruz's foul. In the second half, Juventus surprisingly took the lead: a Claudio Marchisio's cross hit Trezeguet's back and the ball fell to Martín Cáceres, who at his first game in Serie A beat Muslera with a volley. Lazio looked tired in the last ten minutes, and at the 94th minute Juventus doubled by David Trezeguet after a break-back.

The following weekend, Lazio made the trip to Catania to take on Catania at the Angelo Massimino. Catania went immediately ahead after few minutes, by a valuable shot by Jorge Andrés Martínez just inside the penalty area. In the second half, Ballardini replaced Mourad Meghni with Julio Cruz: it was a successful move, as the Argentine striker equalized at the 57th minute by a header after Foggia's cross.

The league schedule took Lazio back to Stadio Olimpico for their next game against Parma on 23 September. As the match against Catania, Lazio went down in the first half, when Valeri Bojinov fired home on the volley within the box. However, Cruz gained a penalty kick at the 41st minute, when he was chopped down by McDonald Mariga inside the area. The penalty was kicked by Zárate who finalized and equalised. Only three minutes later, and Lazio returned the favour to Parma, as Kolarov took Bojinov down and was sent off. Nicola Amoruso made no mistake and put Parma ahead for the second time. Lazio, without a man, wasn't able to equalise again and collected the third home defeat in a row.

League table

Results summary

Results by round

Matches

Top Scorers
  Sergio Floccari 8
  Tommaso Rocchi 4
  Julio Cruz 4
  Stefano Mauri 3
  Mauro Zárate 3
  Aleksandar Kolarov 3

UEFA Europa League

Play-off round

Despite Lazio finishing 10th in the 2008–09 Serie A placing, which does not allow participation in European Competitions, the team could participate in the new Europa League due to the triumph in the 2009 Coppa Italia Final.

Lazio started from the Play-off round, where in Nyon they drew Swedish club IF Elfsborg on 7 August. The first leg was played in Rome, where Lazio won 3–0. Elfsborg went behind after 24 minutes, as Aleksandar Kolarov scored from outside the area with an unstoppable shot that Ante Čović couldn't save. After 12 minutes, Mauro Zárate doubled with a placed shot after a move on the left. Elfsborg tried to score at least one goal, with Fernando Muslera saving multiple shots in the second half, but at the 69th minute, Stefano Mauri, assisted by Zárate, didn't miss in front of Čović and locked the match up for Lazio.

The team started the preparation for the second leg on 25 August, when they trained in the afternoon on an artificial turf pitch, to get used to play on this material present at the Borås Arena, the home ground of Elfsborg. The next day, the team left to Borås. There, Lazio ran into the first defeat of the season, losing for 1–0 at the Borås Arena. Elfsborg went ahead when Denni Avdić scored at the 70th minute by head. In the next minutes, the Swedish team tried to make other two goals to lead the match to the extra time: there was many nervousness, with Kolarov who was sent out and other seven players cautioned at the end of the game. Anyway, Lazio won 3–0 on aggregate and could pass at the group stage.

Group stage

The draw for the group stage took place in Monaco on 28 August 2009. As the 24th top ranked side in this competition, Lazio was seeded in Pot 2 and couldn't meet any team of his own country. Eventually, they were drawn into Group G with Villarreal of Spain, Levski Sofia of Bulgaria and Red Bull Salzburg of Austria.

Lazio started against Red Bull Salzburg on 17 September at home. After a poor first half, Lazio created a flurry of chances in the second half, and went ahead at the 59th minute thanks to Pasquale Foggia by a left-foot shot from the distance. When the match seemed to be going to finish, Salzburg equalized by Franz Schiemer after a defensive error by Lazio at the 82nd minute. Unbelievably, Salzburg went ahead in the stoppage time by Marc Janko, who scored after Cribari unintentionally passed him the ball disastrously. As Villarreal won 1–0 against Levsky Sofia, Lazio was sent temporarily at the third place of the group.

For the next match, two weeks later, Lazio travelled to Sofia to meet Levski Sofia side. The Biancocelesti began the game strongly, and took the lead at the 22nd minute by Matuzalém, who assisted by Zárate in front of the net easily concluded. The Argentine forward doubled at the end of the first half, shooting by right foot beating Tzvetan Dimitrov, Levski Sofia's third goalkeeper who this time was guilty on the goal. Levski tried to respond in the second half, and continued to press their opponents as they took control of the game: Lazio then made them pay for their lack of finishing. Foggia spotted an opening and fed Mourad Meghni, who scored the third goal in front of Dimitrov. Not many minutes later, Foggia opened again, Youssef Rabeh slipped and fell, allowing Rocchi to tap it after avoiding Dimitrov, completing a 4–0 win for Lazio, the biggest one in their season so far. In the meantime, Salzburg surprisingly won in Europe again, this time 2–0 against Villarreal, taking the top of the group, while Lazio reached the second place.

Lazio got their first win at home after almost two months on 22 October, when they were visited from Villarreal. Initially, they hardly got into the game, and didn't create any chances, but despite their poor start, it was them who took the lead. Cruz assisted Zárate in front of Diego López and chipped the ball over him and into the back of the net. Villarreal's dominance finally paid off, however, as they equalized by a Sebastián Eguren's header after a Joan Capdevila cross.

Lazio came out stronger side in the second half, but were then dealt a major blow as Matuzalém was sent off for a suspect diving. As the match seemed to be finished, Rocchi did win the points at the death, scoring after Kolarov cross from the left that finalized through the goalkeeper's legs at the 92nd minute. By this victory, Lazio stayed at the second place of the group, three points above Villarreal and three points below Salzburg that won for the third time in a row in Europe.

Coppa Italia
As winners of the tournament the previous season, Lazio automatically qualified to the Round of 16 for the 2009–10 Coppa Italia.

Squad statistics

Statistics accurate as of match played 28 October 2009

Transfers

Lazio opened their summer market signing the goalkeeper Albano Bizzarri for free from Catania on 10 June, in offing of the departure of Juan Pablo Carrizo, who had stated many times his will to leave in the previous months. The next week, team president Claudio Lotito, after having spent many days in Qatar dealing with Al-Sadd Sports Club board, confirmed that Mauro Zárate's move to Lazio was made permanent for a fee of about €20 million. Later, it was reported that the player signed a new five-year contract with a €60 million buy-out clause. He was the most expensive signing during Lotito's chairmanship in five years. Before June finished, also the international Portuguese Eliseu reached Rome from Málaga for €1 million.

As expected, Carrizo left Lazio at the beginning of July. He was loaned out to Real Zaragoza in a €1 million season-long deal, with Carrizo having an option of signing permanently. Brazilian player Matuzalém, who was initially on loan for a season, was signed permanently for €6.5 million. Luciano Zauri was loaned out to Sampdoria and Alessandro Tuia to Monza. The end of July saw the departure of Czech defender David Rozehnal to German side Hamburger SV for €5 million, and the signing of the Argentine forward Julio Cruz, who had rescinded his contract with Internazionale.

At the end of August, the week of the transfer deadline, academy graduate Lorenzo De Silvestri signed for Fiorentina for €6 million. Also the young forwards Libor Kozák and Ettore Mendicino left the club on loan to Brescia and Crotone respectively.

Come the winter transfer window, Uruguyan youngster Gonzalo Barreto will be joining from Danubio with Lazio having already sealed a €3 million deal, but he will only join in January, when he has turned eighteen.

On 31 January, the club claimed to have signed Israeli prospect Eyal Golasa. However, the move was disputed by the club he played with until then, Maccabi Haifa, which claimed to have a valid contract with him.

And the last day of winter transfer window, Lazio signed Brazilian defender André Dias from São Paulo for a €2.5 million fee.

In

Out

Loaned out

Estimated transfer totals

Expenditure
Summer:   €27,500,000

Winter:  €6,000,000

Total:  €33,500,000

Income
Summer:  €11,000,000

Winter:  €0

Total:  €11,000,000

Overall
Summer:  €16,500,000

Winter:  €6,000,000

Total:   €22,500,000

See also
2009–10 Serie A
2009–10 Coppa Italia
2009–10 UEFA Europa League
2009 Supercoppa Italiana

References

External links

S.S. Lazio Official website 

S.S. Lazio seasons
Lazio